Brittonic or Brythonic may refer to:

Common Brittonic, or Brythonic, the Celtic language anciently spoken in Great Britain
Brittonic languages, a branch of the Celtic languages descended from Common Brittonic
Britons (Celtic people), or Celtic Britons, the Celtic people of Great Britain in ancient times

Language and nationality disambiguation pages